The Last Days of Frankie the Fly is a 1996 crime film directed by Peter Markle, written by Dayton Callie and starring Dennis Hopper, Michael Madsen, Kiefer Sutherland, and Daryl Hannah.

Plot 
Frankie (Dennis Hopper) is a leg man for the mob, and works for Sal (Michael Madsen) and his sidekick, Vic (Dayton Callie). Frankie goes to the set of a porno one day, directed by his friend Joey (Kiefer Sutherland), a NYU film school graduate who owes Sal money. Frankie immediately becomes infatuated with Margaret (Daryl Hannah), a former junkie who wants to become a serious actress. Once a good girl who came to Los Angeles to pursue an acting career, tough situations led her to do drugs and prostitution. Frankie becomes fixated on saving Margaret from the path she's on and keeping her from Sal.

Cast
 Dennis Hopper as Frankie "The Fly"
 Daryl Hannah as Margaret
 Kiefer Sutherland as Joey
 Michael Madsen as Sal
 Dayton Callie as Vic
 Charles Carroll as Thug
 Jack McGee as Jack
 Karen Roeas as Sal's Girl
 Bert Rosario as Miguel
 Adam Scott as Race Track Valet
 Jon Rossas as The Waiter
 Vanessa Ann Giorgioas as Bathroom Girl 
 David "Shark" Fralick as Porno Actor 
 Jana Robbinsas as Nurse
 Nicholas Meleas as Race Track Man

References

External links
 
 

1996 films
1990s crime comedy-drama films
American crime comedy-drama films
Films set in the 1980s
Films set in Los Angeles
Films set in California
Films directed by Peter Markle
Films produced by Elie Samaha
Films scored by George S. Clinton
1990s English-language films
1990s American films